ION Audio is a privately held consumer electronics manufacturer based in Cumberland, Rhode Island, United States. It is part of inMusic Brands. The company was founded in 2002 with the stated aim of providing easy-to-use audio products at an affordable price.

ION Audio designs and manufactures Bluetooth audio products, turntables, electronic musical instruments, and conversion products under the ION brand. Many products combine an analog audio player (e.g. audio/video cassette player, turntable) with an analog-to-digital converter (ADC). These are marketed as devices that allow users to transfer their old analog media to a digital format.

ION Audio won the Best of Innovations Award in 2009 for the Drum Rocker and in 2012 for the Piano Apprentice at the annual Consumer Electronics show (CES) in Las Vegas.

References

External links
ION Audio official website

Audio equipment manufacturers of the United States
Manufacturing companies based in Rhode Island
Music equipment manufacturers
American companies established in 2002
Electronics companies established in 2002
Privately held companies based in Rhode Island